The Australia women's cricket team toured India in December 2022 to play five Twenty20 International (T20I) matches. The Board of Control for Cricket in India (BCCI) confirmed the schedule for the tour in November 2022. Both teams used the series as preparation for the 2023 ICC Women's T20 World Cup tournament.

Australia won the series 4–1, after Heather Graham took a hat-trick in the final match.

Squads

Amanda-Jade Wellington was added to Australia's squad after the first T20I, replacing Jess Jonassen who was ruled out due to a hamstring injury. Australia's captain Alyssa Healy was ruled out of the last match of the series due to an injury, with Tahlia McGrath was appointed as captain.

T20I series

1st T20I

2nd T20I

3rd T20I

4th T20I

5th T20I

Notes

References

External links
 Series home at ESPNcricinfo

2022 in Indian cricket
2022 in Australian cricket
International cricket competitions in 2022–23
Australia 2022-23
Australian cricket tours of India